By Request is the first greatest hits album by Irish boy band Boyzone. It was released on 31 May 1999 by Universal. The album is their best selling release to date, with sales of over 4 million copies worldwide.

Background
The album contains all of the band's singles release since the start of their career in 1994, with the exception of the Irish-only single "Working My Way Back to You", the Japanese only-single "Believe in Me", the American-only single "Mystical Experience", which appears as a bonus track on the Australian release, "Te Garder Pres De Moi", which appears as a bonus track on the French release, and "Everyday I Love You", which despite being an international release, only appears on the Asian release of the album, and was released as a single from The Singles Collection: 1994-1999 in the United Kingdom. The album also features Ronan Keating's first solo outing, "When You Say Nothing at All", plus three tracks only ever previously issued in the United States, on the American version of Where We Belong.

The album was released on 31 May 1999 via Universal, and was preceded by the album's lead single, "When the Going Gets Tough", released on 1 March 1999 as the official Comic Relief single for that year. The album was the second best selling album of the year in Britain, spending nine weeks atop the UK Album Chart, and was certified as 6× Platinum, selling more than four million copies worldwide to date. As of December 2014, it has sold 1,814,966 copies in the UK.

Track listing

Personnel

 Boyzone – vocals
 Michael Mangini – guitar, producer
 James McNally – accordion, whistle
 Ann Morfee – violin
 Steve Morris – violin
 Tessa Niles – background vocals
 Graeme Perkins – organizer
 Audrey Riley – cello
 Trevor Steel – programming, producer
 Miriam Stockley – background vocals
 Carl Sturken – arranger, producer
 Philip Todd – saxophone
 Peter-John Vettese – keyboards
 Warren Wiebe – background vocals
 Gavyn Wright – string director
 Nigel Wright – keyboards, producer
 Guy Barker – trumpet
 Clare Finnimore – viola
 Matt Howe – mix engineer
 Gillian Kent – violin
 Michael Hart Thompson – guitar
 Jeremy Wheatley – mix engineer
 Andy Caine – background vocals
 Clare Thompson – violin
 Bruce White – viola
 John Matthews – background vocals
 Andy Earl – photography
 Alex Black – assistant engineer
 Tim Willis – assistant engineer

 Ben Allen – guitar
 John R. Angier – keyboards
 Emma Black – cello
 Deborah Widdup – violin
 Nastee – DJ
 Anna Hemery – violin
 Wayne Hector – background vocals, vocal arrangement
 Yvonne John Lewis – background vocals
 Absolute – Producer, mix engineer
 Richard George – violin
 Skoti-Alain Elliot – bass, programming, track engineer
 Laura Melhuish – violin
 Orla Quirke – design, direction
 Jim Steinman – producer, executive producer
 Paul Martin – viola
 Tracie Ackerman – background vocals
 Tom Lord-Alge – mix engineer
 Andy Bradfield – remixing
 Nick Cooper – cello
 Ian Curnow – producer
 Danny Grant – keyboards
 Sue Dench – viola
 Andy Duncan – drums
 Simon Franglen – keyboards, engineer, programming
 Scott Gordon – vocal engineer
 Mark Hudson – vocal arrangement, vocal producer
 Eric Lijestrand – digital editing
 Steve Lipson – bass, producer, programming, mandolin
 Danny Foy – Guitar

Charts

Weekly charts

Year-end charts

Decade-end charts

Certifications

References

1999 greatest hits albums
Boyzone albums
Universal Records compilation albums
Albums produced by Carl Sturken and Evan Rogers